Gorokhovets is the name of several inhabited localities in Russia.

Urban localities
Gorokhovets, Vladimir Oblast, a town in Gorokhovetsky District of Vladimir Oblast

Rural localities
Gorokhovets, Leningrad Oblast, a village in Glazhevskoye Settlement Municipal Formation of Kirishsky District of Leningrad Oblast